Kochanówka may refer to the following places:
Kochanówka, Greater Poland Voivodeship (west-central Poland)
Kochanówka, Masovian Voivodeship (east-central Poland)
Kochanówka, Subcarpathian Voivodeship (south-east Poland)
Kochanówka, Warmian-Masurian Voivodeship (north Poland)